In Greek mythology, Perses is the son of the Titan Crius and Eurybia, and thus brother to Astraeus and Pallas. Ancient tradition records very little of Perses other than his marriage and offspring, his role largely being purely genealogical, existing merely to provide a parentage for other, more important figures.

Etymology 
His name is derived from the Ancient Greek word perthō ( – "to sack", "to ravage", "to destroy").

Mythology 
Hesiod describes Perses as "eminent among all men in wisdom." He was wed to Asteria, the daughter of Phoebe and Coeus, with whom he had one child, Hecate, honoured by Zeus above all others as the goddess of magic, crossroads, and witchcraft. He might be the Perses that is the father of Chariclo, the wife of Chiron, in some versions.

He was confused with another Perses (the son of the sun god Helios and Perse), who was made the father of Hecate in some versions.

Family tree

See also 
 Athena
 Perses of Colchis

Notes

References 

 Apollodorus, The Library with an English Translation by Sir James George Frazer, F.B.A., F.R.S. in 2 Volumes, Cambridge, MA, Harvard University Press; London, William Heinemann Ltd. 1921. ISBN 0-674-99135-4. Online version at the Perseus Digital Library. Greek text available from the same website.
 Hesiod, Theogony from The Homeric Hymns and Homerica with an English Translation by Hugh G. Evelyn-White, Cambridge, MA.,Harvard University Press; London, William Heinemann Ltd. 1914. Online version at the Perseus Digital Library. Greek text available from the same website.

External links 
 PERSES from Mythopedia
 PERSES from the Theoi Project

Titans (mythology)
Destroyer gods
Greek war deities
Greek gods
Wisdom gods
War gods